Metisella metis, the gold spotted sylph, is a butterfly of the family Hesperiidae. It is found in the Cape and KwaZulu-Natal in South Africa.

The wingspan is 26–34 mm for males and 30–33 mm for females. The upperside of the wings are dark brown or black with a number of gold spots. The flight period is year-round, peaking between September and November and between February and March.

The larvae feed on Stenotaphrum glabrum, Panicum deustum, Ehrharta erecta and Stipa dregeana.

Subspecies
Metisella metis metis (South Africa: Western Cape Province, from the Cape Peninsula, east to the Swellendam district)
Metisella metis paris Evans, 1937 (Mozambique, Zimbabwe, Eswatini, South Africa: Limpopo Province, Mpumalanga, KwaZulu-Natal, Eastern Cape Province, Western Cape Province)

References

Butterflies described in 1764
Heteropterinae
Butterflies of Africa
Taxa named by Carl Linnaeus